The 2018–19 Nemzeti Bajnokság I (also known as 2018–19 OTP Bank Liga), also known as NB I, was the 120th season of top-tier football in Hungary. The league was officially named OTP Bank Liga for sponsorship reasons. Videoton were the defending champions.

Fixtures were published on 27 June 2018.

Teams
Balmazújváros and Vasas finished the 2017–18 Nemzeti Bajnokság I in the last two places and thus were relegated to NB II division.

The two relegated teams were replaced with the top two teams in 2017–18 Nemzeti Bajnokság II, champion MTK and runner-up Kisvárda, each having the required licence for top-division play.

Stadium and locations
Following is the list of clubs competed in the league this season, with their location, stadium and stadium capacity.

Personnel and kits
All teams are obligated to have the logo of the league sponsor OTP Bank as well as the Nemzeti Bajnokság I logo on the right sleeve of their shirt. 

Note: Flags indicate national team as has been defined under FIFA eligibility rules. Players and Managers may hold more than one non-FIFA nationality.

Managerial changes

League table

Positions by round

Results

Rounds 1–22

Rounds 23–33

Season statistics

Top goalscorers

Hat-tricks

Average attendances

See also
2018–19 Magyar Kupa
2018–19 Nemzeti Bajnokság II
2018–19 Nemzeti Bajnokság III

References

External links
  
 Official rules 
 uefa.com

Nemzeti Bajnokság I seasons
1
Hungary